Fernan Lake Village is a city in Kootenai County, Idaho, United States. The population was 169 at the 2010 census.

Geography
Fernan Lake Village is located at  (47.672122, -116.747683).

Demographics

2010 census
As of the census of 2010, there were 169 people, 72 households, and 51 families residing in the city. The racial makeup of the city was 96.4% White, 0.6% African American, 1.2% Native American, and 1.8% Asian. Hispanic or Latino of any race were 4.7% of the population.

There were 72 households, of which 22.2% had children under the age of 18 living with them, 68.1% were married couples living together, 1.4% had a female householder with no husband present, 1.4% had a male householder with no wife present, and 29.2% were non-families. 19.4% of all households were made up of individuals, and 11.1% had someone living alone who was 65 years of age or older. The average household size was 2.35 and the average family size was 2.73.

The median age in the city was 54.3 years. 16.6% of residents were under the age of 18; 5.3% were between the ages of 18 and 24; 17.8% were from 25 to 44; 36.1% were from 45 to 64; and 24.3% were 65 years of age or older. The gender makeup of the city was 53.8% male and 46.2% female.

2000 census
As of the census of 2000, there were 186 people, 70 households, and 52 families residing in the city. The racial makeup of the city was 95.16% White, 0.54% Native American, 2.15% Asian, 0.54% from other races, and 1.61% from two or more races. Hispanic or Latino of any race were 1.61% of the population.

There were 70 households, out of which 44.3% had children under the age of 18 living with them, 65.7% were married couples living together, 2.9% had a female householder with no husband present, and 25.7% were non-families. 22.9% of all households were made up of individuals, and 14.3% had someone living alone who was 65 years of age or older.  The average household size was 2.66 and the average family size was 3.15.

In the city, the population was spread out, with 30.1% under the age of 18, 3.2% from 18 to 24, 17.2% from 25 to 44, 28.5% from 45 to 64, and 21.0% who were 65 years of age or older.  The median age was 45 years. For every 100 females, there were 104.4 males.  For every 100 females age 18 and over, there were 91.2 males.

The median income for a household in the city was $68,125, and the median income for a family was $73,125. Males had a median income of $80,393 versus $43,125 for females. The per capita income for the city was $35,384.  About 9.3% of families and 14.6% of the population were below the poverty line, including 28.3% of those under the age of eighteen and none of those 65 or over.

References

Cities in Idaho
Cities in Kootenai County, Idaho